I'm a People is an album by American country music artist George Jones. It was released in 1966 on the Musicor Records label.  The album hit number one on the country chart.  George Bedard of AllMusic writes, "One of the more consistent Musicor offerings, it features a good mix of uptempo honky tonk and novelty ("I'm a People", "Ship of Love" and "Blindfold of Love"), ballads (the eerie "The Lonely Know My Secret"), and sacred songs ("If You Believe" and "Old Brush Arbors"). "Four-O-Thirty Three" and the title track were both top ten country hits.  I'm A People also includes the "World Of Forgotten People" written by fellow country star Loretta Lynn. In his essay for the 1994 Sony compilation The Essential George Jones: The Spirit of Country, Rich Kienzle observes that the Dallas Frazier-penned title track contains an arrangement "clearly designed to imitate Roger Miller's hit novelties.  George even attempted to scat-sing as Miller often did on his own hits."

Track listing
"I'm a People" (Dallas Frazier) - 2:09
"Don't Think I Don't Love You" (Dallas Frazier)
"Ship of Love" (George Jones, Earl Montgomery)
"Once a Day" (Bill Anderson)
"If You Believe" (Darrell Edwards)
"Blindfold of Love" (Dallas Frazier, Clarence Selman)
"Four-o-Thirty-Three" (George Jones, Earl Montgomery) - 2:26
"I Don't Love You Anymore" (Bill Anderson)
"Lonely Know My Secret" (Earl Montgomery)
"World of Forgotten People" (Loretta Lynn)
"I Woke Up from Dreaming" (Dallas Frazier)
"Old Brush Arbors" (Darrell Edwards, Gordon Ardis)

Personnel
George Jones - vocals
The Jordanaires - vocal accompaniment 
Technical
Bob Scerbo - album coordinator
Jack Kaufman - album design
Charles Varon - cover photography

External links
George Jones' Official Website

1966 albums
George Jones albums
Musicor Records albums
Albums produced by Pappy Daily